Ayman Ratova (née Kozhakhmetova) (born 23 April 1991 in Taldykorgan) is a Kazakhstani race walker. She competed in the 20 km kilometres event at the 2012 Summer Olympics.  Her twin Sholpan also competed in that event at the 2012 Olympics.

She served a 2-year competition ban for the use of prohibited substances, EPO and testosterone, lasting from 18 August 2013 to 11 September 2015.

References

1991 births
Living people
People from Taldykorgan
Kazakhstani female racewalkers
Olympic athletes of Kazakhstan
Athletes (track and field) at the 2012 Summer Olympics
Athletes (track and field) at the 2020 Summer Olympics
Doping cases in athletics
World Athletics Championships athletes for Kazakhstan
Kazakhstani sportspeople in doping cases

Twin people
20th-century Kazakhstani women
21st-century Kazakhstani women